Helmi Moustafa (11 June 1911 – 9 May 1992) was an Egyptian footballer who captained Al Masry SC. He competed in the men's tournament at the 1936 Summer Olympics.

References

External links
 

1911 births
1992 deaths
Egyptian footballers
Egypt international footballers
Olympic footballers of Egypt
Footballers at the 1936 Summer Olympics
Place of birth missing
Association football midfielders